The Idol may refer to:

 The Idol (1923 film), a 1923 Polish film
 The Idol (1966 film), a 1966 British drama film directed by Daniel Petrie
 The iDol (2006 film), a 2006 Japanese sci-fi film directed by Norman England
 The Idol (2015 film), a 2015 Palestinian film
 The Idol (TV series), a 2023 American television series
 "The Idol", a song by W.A.S.P. from The Crimson Idol

See also
 Idol (disambiguation)
 Idol (film), 2019 South Korean thriller film
 L'idole, 2002 film by Samantha Lang